The Dwars door de Antwerpse Kempen is a European cycling race held in Belgium, departing from Mol and arriving at Maria-ter-Heide. Since 2010, the race has been organised as a 1.2 event on the UCI Europe Tour.

Winners

UCI Europe Tour races
Cycle races in Belgium
Recurring sporting events established in 2010
2010 establishments in Belgium
Mol, Belgium